Cowal is a town located in West Java, Indonesia.

References

Populated places in West Java